Weekend in Paradise (German: Weekend im Paradies) is a 1931 German musical comedy film directed by Robert Land and starring Trude Berliner, Claire Rommer, and Julius Falkenstein. It was remade in 1952.

The film's art direction was by Robert Neppach and Erwin Scharf.

Cast
 Otto Wallburg as Regierungsrat Dittchen
 Claire Rommer as Hedwig, Dittchens Frau
 Julius Falkenstein as Ministerialdirektor Dr. Grimeisen
 Walter Steinbeck as Ministerialrat Breitenbach
 Anton Pointner as Oberregierungsrat von Giersdorf
 Wolf von Rothberg as Regierungsassessor Winkler
 Aenne Goerling as Adele Haubenschildt, Landtagsabgeordnete
 Trude Berliner as Tutti, Animierdame
 Else Elster as Lore Dietrich, Stenotypistin
 Hans Halden as Wuttke, Bürodiener
 Franz Weber as Seidel, Kriminalwachtmeister
 Hans Hermann Schaufuß as Badrian, Villenbesitzer
 Paul Westermeier as Brose, Diener im "Hotel Paradies"
 Kurt Lilien as Löffler, Portier
 Eva L'Arronge as Olly
 Siegfried Breuer as Schmidt

Plot 
Hard-working civil servant Dittchen hasn't been promoted for years. Colleagues pass all the work on to him. He gets a visit from the state parliamentarian, Haubenschildt, who complains about immoral goings-on in the weekend hotel "Paradies". Dittchen takes this as an opportunity to investigate the hotel. There he discovers all his superiors. Because nobody wants to be listed in the official report, Dittchen is urged to remove the names of his superiors from the files. In return, he is promoted several times.

References

Bibliography
 Günther Dahlke & Günter Karl. Deutsche Spielfilme von den Anfängen bis 1933: ein Filmführer. Henschelverlag Kunst und Gesellschaft, 1988.

External links 
 

1931 films
1931 musical comedy films
Films of the Weimar Republic
German musical comedy films
1930s German-language films
Films directed by Robert Land
German films based on plays
German black-and-white films
1930s German films